Jüri Looväli (also Jüri Land; 3 May 1897 Vastemõisa Parish (now Põhja-Sakala Parish), Kreis Fellin – 10 July 1963 London) was an Estonian politician. He was a member of VI Riigikogu (its Chamber of Deputies). During the German occupation of Estonia, from 1941 until 1944, Looväli served as the Governor of Pärnu County within the framework of the Estonian Self-Administration of Generalbezirk Estland. In 1944, as the Red Army was approaching, he went into exile.

References

1897 births
1963 deaths
People from Põhja-Sakala Parish
People from Kreis Fellin
Patriotic League (Estonia) politicians
Members of the Riigivolikogu
Estonian Self-Administration
Estonian World War II refugees
Estonian emigrants to the United Kingdom